The whip fan (Eunicella albicans), also called the flagellar sea fan, is a species of gorgonian sea fan in the family Gorgoniidae.

Description
This fan is orange and has flexible whip-like branches. It may grow up to 70 cm tall and have branches of 0.3 to 0.5 cm wide.

Distribution
This sea fan is found only around the South African coast from the Atlantic side of the Cape Peninsula to Port Elizabeth in 10–30 m of water. It is endemic to this region.

Ecology
This sea fan is preyed upon by the whip fan nudibranch, Tritonia nilsodhneri, which closely resembles the feeding fan.

References 

Gorgoniidae
Animals described in 1865